Emma Minna Hilde Hildebrand (10 September 1897 – 12 May 1976) was a German actress born in Hanover, Germany on 10 September 1897. She died at the age of 78 in Grunewald, Berlin, on 27 May 1976.

Selected filmography

 Die Scheidungsehe (1920, Short)
Der Herr Papa - Else (1921)
 Es bleibt in der Familie (1922, Short) as Schauspielerin Molly
 Schwarzwaldkinder (1922) as Liesbeth, Tochter von Nikodemus Grieshaber
 Lohengrins Heirat (1922) as Elsa
 Hotel zum goldenen Engel (1922) as Ella
Der Herr Landrat (1922) as Molli Jolli
 The Dealer from Amsterdam (1925) as Susi
 Sechs Mädchen suchen Nachtquartier (1928)
 The Gallant Hussar (1928) Vilma von Noszty
 Rasputins Liebesabenteuer (1928) Dirne Gregubowa
 Meine Frau, seine Frau (1931, Short)
 Different Morals (1931) Cora Petry
 The Fate of Renate Langen (1931) as Marion
 Arme, kleine Eva! (1931) as Erna Steindamm
 Panic in Chicago (1931) as  Susy Owen
 The Little Escapade (1931) as Lona Wernecke, seine Frau
 Bobby Gets Going (1931) as Olga Loty
 Madame Makes Her Exit (1931) as Eva - die Freundin
My Leopold (1931) as Rosita
 The Unknown Guest (1931) as Ita Hanna
 The Ladies Diplomat (1932) as Olga seine Frau
 The Beautiful Adventure  (1932) as Frau de Serignon
 Strafsache van Geldern (1932) 
 Drei von der Kavallerie (1932) as Lola von Heldburg
 Ballhaus goldener Engel (1932) 
 The Importance of Being Earnest (1932)
 When Love Sets the Fashion (1932) as Suzanne
 Impossible Love (1932) as Frl. Martini
 Ein Lied für Dich (1933)
 Moral und Liebe (1933) as Lissy
 Manolescu, Prince of Thieves (1933) as Marion Lamond
 Jumping Into the Abyss (1933) as Eva Volkmann
 Greetings and Kisses, Veronika (1933) as Klara Becker, seine Frau
 D. K. 1 greift ein  (1933) as  Olly
 Ways to a Good Marriage (1933) as Eugenie von Bergen, die nymphomanische Frau
 Love Must Be Understood (1933) as Ellen Parker, seine Braut
  (1933) as Frau Bobrinski
 Gretel Wins First Prize (1933) as  Gerda, seine geschiedene Frau
Viktor und Viktoria (1933) as Ellinor
 My Heart Calls You (1934) as Margot
  (1934) as Rita, Schauspielerin
 Little Dorrit (1934) as Lily, seine Tochter
 Polish Blood (1934) as Wanda Kwasinskaja
 The English Marriage (1934) as Bella Amery
 Peter, Paul and Nanette (1935) as Mary
 Ein falscher Fuffziger (1935) as Frau Strachwitz
 Barcarole (1935) as Ludovisca
 Artisten (1935) as Vera Leander
 Amphitryon (1935) as 1. Freundin Alkmenes
 The Private Life of Louis XIV (1935) as Duchesse de Montespan
 The King's Prisoner (1935) as Fräulein von Mallwitz
 I Was Jack Mortimer (1935) as Daisy
His Late Excellency (1935) as Baronin v. Windegg
 The Czar's Courier (1936) as Zangara, Ogareff's mistress
 Die letzte Fahrt der Santa Margareta (1936) as Miß Mabel Glann
 Tomfoolery (1936) as Aimée
 Fräulein Veronika (1936) as Dora
 Maria the Maid (1936) as Actress Alice Winter
 Kinderarzt Dr. Engel (1936) as Mutter eines Kindes im Krankenhaus
 Madona in Warenhaus (1936)
 Mother Song (1937) as Ricarda Doret, seine Frau
 Es leuchten die Sterne (1938) as Singer
 The Girl of Last Night (1938) as Lady Darnmore
 Der Tag nach der Scheidung (1938) as Susi Lang
 Dance on the Volcano (1938) as Gräfin X
 The Green Emperor (1939) as Nora
 Bel Ami (1939) as Clotilde von Marelle
 Silvesternacht am Alexanderplatz (1939) as Madeleine
 Parkstraße 13 (1939) as Baronin Bornegg
 Marriage in Small Doses (1939) as Frau Conradi
 Das Glück wohnt nebenan (1939) 
 Frau nach Maß (1940) as Hermine Campe
 My Daughter Doesn't Do That (1940) as Sängerin
Der Kleinstadtpoet (1940) as  Lona Elvira
 Alarm (1941) as Pensionsinhaberin Frau Anders
Jenny und der Herr im Frack (1941) as  Lilly Hegedüsch
 Die heimlichen Bräute (1942) as Daniela Dannenberg Sängerin
 Reise in die Vergangenheit (1943) as Lily, Carlos Frau
 Die schwache Stunde (1943) as Roxy
 Spiel (1944)
 Große Freiheit Nr. 7 (1944) as Anita
 Spiel mit der Liebe (1944)
 Ich bitte um Vollmacht (1944) as Sängerin Daniela Dannberg
 The Appeal to Conscience (1945)
 Ghost in the Castle (1947) as Camilla
   (1948) as Jeanette
 The Appeal to Conscience (1949) as Meta Puchalla
 Kätchen für alles  (1949) as Maria
  (1949) as Signora Rinuccini
 Kleiner Wagen – große Liebe (1949)
 Schuß um Mitternacht (1950) as Schauspielerin Elvira
 Verlobte Leute (1950) as Frau Rehbein - die Portiersfrau
 The Orplid Mystery (1950) as Mrs. Eleanor Hoopman
 (1950) as Mademoiselle Yvonne
 The Tiger Akbar (1951) as  Madame Regina, Kunstreiterin
Immortal Light (1951) as Madame de Latour
 The Guilt of Doctor Homma (1951) as Frau Burde
 She (1954) as Nachbarin
 The Three from the Filling Station (1954)
 Pariser Geschichten (1956)
 Adorable Arabella (1959) as Lady Bridlington
 Carnival Confession (1960) as Mme. Guttier

Television
1957: Weekend (TV film)
1958: César (TV film) - Honorine, Fannys Mutter
1958: Colombe (TV film) - Madame Alexandre
1959: The Abduction of the Sabine Women (TV film) - Friedrike Gollwitz
1961: Einladung ins Schloß (TV film) - Madame Desmermortes
1962: Nicht zuhören, meine Damen! (TV film) - Julie Bille en Bois
1962: Überfahrt (TV film) - Mrs. Cliveden-Banks
1963:  - Mrs. Celia Peachum
1963: Heiraten ist immer ein Risiko (TV film) - Lydia Barbent
1964: Bis ans Ende (TV film) - Agatha Payne
1969: Katzenzungen (TV film) - Tante Fini
1971: Der Kommissar: Der Moormörder (TV series episode) - Frau Steger
1971: Wölfe und Schafe (TV film) - Meropa Mursawetzkaja
1972: Das System Fabrizzi (TV film) - Signora Sartori (final film role)

External links
 

1897 births
1976 deaths
German film actresses
German silent film actresses
German stage actresses
20th-century German actresses